Macroglossum aquila is a moth of the family Sphingidae. It is known from north-eastern India, Bangladesh, Thailand, southern China, Vietnam, Malaysia (Peninsular, Sarawak), Indonesia (Sumatra, Java, Kalimantan) and the Philippines (Luzon).

The wingspan is 49–54 mm.

References

Macroglossum
Moths described in 1875
Moths of Asia